Pleasant Park station is a bus stop on Ottawa's Transitway served by OC Transpo buses. It is located in the southeastern transitway section at Pleasant Park Road (a collector road through Alta Vista) near Riverside Drive.  The station is mostly used by people who take the 49 bus to or from Alta Vista, or by local residents in the nearby residential areas.

The station has two levels: one connecting to Pleasant Park Road, the other to the transitway.

It is one of the more lightly used stations due to the lack of any other trip generators or transfer connections.

Service

The following routes serve Pleasant Park:

Notes 
 Route  is the only route that serves the upper level of this station.

References

External links
OC Transpo station page
OC Transpo Area Map

1996 establishments in Ontario
Transitway (Ottawa) stations